Morosaphycita oculiferella is a moth of the family Pyralidae described by Edward Meyrick in 1879. It is known from Australia (including Queensland and the Australian Capital Territory) and New Zealand.

The wingspan is about 20 mm. Adults have dark brown forewings with various dark lines, each having a white mark near the base of the inner margin. The hindwings are off white, with narrow dark margins.

References

Phycitinae
Moths of New Zealand
Taxa named by Edward Meyrick
Moths of Australia
Moths described in 1879